Chattanooga Valley is a census-designated place (CDP) in Walker County, Georgia, United States. The population was 3,962 at the 2020 census. It is part of the Chattanooga, TN–GA Metropolitan Statistical Area.

Chattanooga is a Muskogean-language name meaning "rock coming to a point".

Geography
Chattanooga Valley is located at  (34.922236, -85.335453).

Demographics

2020 census

As of the 2020 United States census, there were 3,962 people, 1,410 households, and 891 families residing in the CDP.

2000 census
As of the census of 2000, there were 4,065 people, 1,588 households, and 1,225 families residing in the CDP. The racial makeup of the CDP was 98.18% White, 0.54% African American, 0.30% Native American, 0.22% Asian, 0.32% from other races, and 0.44% from two or more races. Hispanic or Latino of any race were 0.69% of the population.

There were 1,588 households, out of which 31.4% had children under the age of 18 living with them, 63.6% were married couples living together, 10.1% had a female householder with no husband present, and 22.8% were non-families. 20.4% of all households were made up of individuals, and 9.3% had someone living alone who was 65 years of age or older.  The average household size was 2.56 and the average family size was 2.93.

In the CDP, the population was spread out, with 23.7% under the age of 18, 7.7% from 18 to 24, 29.2% from 25 to 44, 25.0% from 45 to 64, and 14.5% who were 65 years of age or older.  The median age was 38 years. For every 100 females, there were 95.0 males.  For every 100 females age 18 and over, there were 91.1 males.

The median income for a household in the CDP was $34,950, and the median income for a family was $40,720. Males had a median income of $32,250 versus $22,083 for females. The per capita income for the CDP was $17,415.  About 6.9% of families and 9.5% of the population were below the poverty line, including 16.3% of those under age 18 and 6.9% of those age 65 or over.

References

Census-designated places in Georgia (U.S. state)
Census-designated places in Walker County, Georgia